Pablo Gabriel Etchegoin (12 September 1964 – 29 April 2013 ) was an Argentine-New Zealand physicist.

Academic career
Born in 1964 in La Plata, Argentina, he obtained a BSc in electrical engineering from the National University of La Plata and then The Institute of Physics José A Balseiro where he obtained a BSc in Physics in 1989. He completed his PhD at the Max Planck Institute for Solid State Physics in Stuttgart with Manuel Cardona in 1994 and spent time at the University of Cambridge before moving to Victoria University of Wellington in 2003, where he built a Raman spectroscopy lab. In 2004, he was awarded the T. K. Sidey Medal, an award set up by the Royal Society of New Zealand for outstanding scientific research. He died of pancreatic cancer in 2013.

References

External links
 google scholar 
 institutional homepage
 Memorial page by the MacDiarmid Institute
 Obituary by the Royal Society of New Zealand

Deaths from pancreatic cancer
1964 births
2013 deaths
People from La Plata
National University of La Plata alumni
University of Stuttgart alumni
Academic staff of the Victoria University of Wellington
Fellows of the Royal Society of New Zealand
New Zealand physicists
Argentine emigrants to New Zealand